Bethany Lynch (born 19 May 1997) is an Australian rules footballer who plays for Richmond in the AFL Women's competition (AFL). She has previously played for North Melbourne.

AFLW career
Lynch played for Richmond in the VFL Women's (VFLW) competition before she was rookie listed by North Melbourne for their AFL Women's (AFLW) list following the 2018 AFL Women's draft. She made her debut in a four-point victory over Melbourne in the fourth round of the 2019 season. After playing eight games for the club, she was delisted in June 2021.

In December 2021, Lynch joined Richmond's primary AFLW list, after Iilish Ross was placed on the inactive list due to injury.

Personal life
She is the sister of Richmond player, Tom Lynch.

References

External links 

1997 births
Living people
North Melbourne Football Club (AFLW) players
Australian rules footballers from Victoria (Australia)
Richmond Football Club (AFLW) players